Muara Bungo Airport  is an airport in Muara Bungo, Jambi, Indonesia. The airport started operating on November 25, 2012.

Until October 2014 only Aviastar used the airport three times a week due to the runway being only 1,350 meters long. Runway extension is still ongoing; it was predicted to be 1,500 meters at the end of 2014 and was expected to reach its final 2,000 meters at the end of 2015.

Around 2016, runway extension for Muara Bungo Airport was finished. On July 3, 2016, Sriwijaya Air inaugurated a four times weekly flight from Jakarta to Muara Bungo using Boeing 737-500 aircraft. Sriwijaya Air later transferred this route to NAM Air and increased flights from four times weekly to daily flights.

Airlines and destinations

Statistics

References

Airports in Sumatra
Buildings and structures in Jambi